"Southernplayalisticadillacmuzik" is a song by American hip hop duo Outkast, released on June 21, 1994 as the second single from their debut studio album of the same name. The title track managed to chart at #74 on the Billboard Hot 100, however failed to live up to the success of their previous single, "Player's Ball", which charted at #37 on that same chart.

Track listing
 CD Single
 "Southernplayalisticadillacmuzik" (Organised Extended Remix) – 5:47
 "Southernplayalisticadillacmuzik" (LP Version) – 5:18
 "Southernplayalisticadillacmuzik" (Diamond D Remix) – 4:55
 "Southernplayalisticadillacmuzik" (Organised Instrumental) – 5:47

12" Vinyl Single
 "Southernplayalisticadillacmuzik" (Organised Remix) – 6:54
 "Southernplayalisticadillacmuzik" (Organised Instrumental) – 6:54
 "Southernplayalisticadillacmuzik" (Diamond D Remix) – 7:05
 "Southernplayalisticadillacmuzik" (Diamond D Instrumental) – 7:05

Personnel

 André 3000 – vocals
Big Boi – vocals 
Organized Noize – keyboards, programming, mixing engineer, producer 
Edwars Strout – guitar
Preston Crump – bass
Kenneth Wright – piano, organ
Jeff Sparks – saxophone
Society of Soul – background vocals
Debra Killings – background vocals
Brandon Bennet – background vocals
Tony Hightower – background vocals
Leslie Brathwaite – producer

Charts

References

1993 singles
1993 songs
Music videos directed by F. Gary Gray
Outkast songs
Song recordings produced by Organized Noize

pt:Southernplayalisticadillacmuzik (canção)